The Burleigh County Courthouse in Bismarck, North Dakota was designed in the Art Deco style by architect Ira Rush.  It was built in 1931 and was listed on the U.S. National Register of Historic Places in 1985.

It is a three-story courthouse  with a two-story office addition.  It has aluminum spandrels.

See also
Adams County Courthouse, also designed by Rush and NRHP-listed

References

Courthouses on the National Register of Historic Places in North Dakota
County courthouses in North Dakota
Art Deco architecture in North Dakota
Government buildings completed in 1931
1931 establishments in North Dakota
National Register of Historic Places in Bismarck, North Dakota